American hip hop recording artist Sage the Gemini has released one studio album, one extended play (EP), one mixtape and 33 singles (including 21 as a featured artist).

Albums

Studio albums

EPs

Mixtapes

Singles

As lead artist

As featured artist

Guest appearances

Production discography

2012
Smoovie Baby –  Young, Wild & Pretty
03. "Turnt Up"
09. "Watch Ya Mouth"

AM Dre –  I Am
05. “Kesha” (featuring Smoovie Baby and Salty)

2013
Smoovie Baby – 5 Hunnit Degreez
06. “Blast Off” (featuring D. Cannons)

D-Mac
"Resumè" (featuring Smoovie Baby and Sage the Gemini)

D. Cannons – TTA2
01. "Blast Off Again"

Iamsu! and Problem – Million Dollar Fro
02. "Don't Stop"

Tyga – Well Done IV
08. "Pressed" (featuring Honey Cocaine)

Iamsu! – Kilt 2
13. "Return of the Mack" (featuring Sage the Gemini and P-Lo)
 Sage the Gemini 
"Do It Again" (featuring Smoovie Baby)

2014
Smoovie Baby – All In: The EP
07. "Top Down" (featuring Sage the Gemini)

2015
 Derek King
 "Prince Charming" (featuring TJ Bridges)

2016
JuicetheFlyest
"Like Me" (featuring Sage the Gemini and Derek King)
Chinae 
"Wednesday" (featuring Sage the Gemini)

2017
SOB X RBE - Gangin
13. "Y.H.U.N.G."

2018
Show Banga and Matty4 
"F*ck Suckaz"

2020
Tinashe
"Rascal (Superstar)"

Notes

References

External links 
 

Discographies of American artists
Hip hop discographies